Alexey Milchakov (born 30 April 1991 in St. Petersburg) is a Russian neo-Nazi, suspected war criminal and co-leader and co-founder of the DShRG Rusich of the Wagner Group. He is as of 2022 sanctioned by the United States, the European Union, the United Kingdom, Canada and other countries. He has been linked to atrocities in both Syria and Ukraine, and has been described as "the symbol of Russian neo-Nazis fighting in the Donbass".

Biography 
He was born in Leningrad (now St. Petersburg). Milchakov calls himself a fan of FC Zenit.

Animal abuse 
Milchakov first came to public attention after he filmed himself torturing and decapitating a puppy in 2011, posting the footage online. A petition calling to hold him accountable was supported by more than 5500 people. At the same time animal rights activists addressed FC Zenit fans in order for them to give an assessment to Milchakov's actions. 
In his VK page he also called for killing of homeless people, puppies and children.

War In Donbas 
Milchakov participated as a volunteer in the war in Donbas from 2014, stating later he wanted "to kill". According to his own account, Milchakov formed Rusich together with Yan Petrovsky in the summer of 2014, after going through a paramilitary training program run by the Russian Imperial Legion. He has openly bragged about photographing the bodies of mutilated and burnt Ukrainian bodies from the paramilitary Aidar group in 2014. Milchakov is also reputed to have cut ears of Ukrainian corpses and scratched swastikas on their faces. By 2015, he had been sanctioned by the European Union, United Kingdom and Canada. He has used the call signs "Fritz" and "Serb".

In a 2020 video, Milchakov described himself as a "Nazi", stating: "I'm not going to go deep and say, I'm a nationalist, a patriot, an imperialist, and so forth. I'll say it outright: I'm a Nazi."

In August 2022, Nexta posted a tweet of footage showing Milchakov in Ukraine. According to the German Intelligence Service, Milchakov was allegedly injured in the 2022 Russian invasion of Ukraine.

Sanctions 
Sanctioned by New Zealand in relation to the 2022 Russian invasion of Ukraine.

References

Russian war crimes
Russian war crimes in Ukraine
Russian neo-Nazis
Neo-Nazism in Russia
1991 births
Living people
People of the Wagner Group